The African Studies Association (ASA) is a US-based association of scholars, students, practitioners, and institutions with an interest in the continent of Africa. Founded in 1957, the ASA is the leading organization of African Studies in North America, with a global membership of approximately 2000. The association's headquarters are at Rutgers University in New Jersey. The ASA holds annual conferences and virtual events for its members year-round.

As a result of racial and political disputes over exclusion from leadership positions of black academics and ASA leaders' ties with the US intelligence and military in the mid-twentieth century, the ASA split in 1968, when the Black Caucus of the ASA, led by John Henrik Clarke, founded the African Heritage Studies Association (AHSA).

The ASA is different from the African Studies Association of Africa (ASAA), which was founded at the University of Cape Town in October 1-2, 2012.

Awards given by ASA

ASA Best Book Prize 

The ASA Book Prize is given annually for the best scholarly work (including translations) on Africa published in English in the previous year and distributed in the United States. The award was originally named after Melville Herskovits, one of the founders of the ASA. The name was changed in 2019 as the ASA considered how to decolonize the discipline of African studies.

Distinguished Africanist Award 
Beginning in 1984, the association has awarded the Distinguished Africanist Award. In 2000, 2001, and 2022 two awards were given. Winners include:

Bethwell Ogot Book Prize 
The Bethwell A. Ogot Book Prize of the African Studies Association is awarded annually at the ASA Annual Meeting to the author of the best book on East African Studies published in the previous calendar year. Initiated in 2012, the award was made possible by a generous bequest from the estate of the late Professor Kennell Jackson, the award honors the eminent historian, Professor Bethwell A. Ogot.

Winners of this award are:
2012 Andrew Ivaska, Cultured States: Youth, Gender, and Modern Style in 1960s Dar es Salaam
2013 James R. Brennan, Taifa: Making Nation and Race in Urban Tanzania
2014 Shane Doyle, Before HIV: Sexuality, Fertility and Mortality in East Africa 1900–1980
2015 J.J. Carney, Rwanda Before the Genocide: Catholic Politics and Ethnic Discourse in the Late Colonial Era
2016 Elena Vezzadini, Lost Nationalism Revolution, Memory and Anti-colonial Resistance in Sudan
2017 Bert Ingelaere, Inside Rwanda's Gacaca Courts: Seeking Justice after Genocide
2018 Getnet Bekele, Ploughing New Ground: Food, Farming, and Environmental Change in Ethiopia
2019 Laura Fair, Reel Pleasures: Cinema Audiences and Entrepreneurs in Twentieth-Century Urban Tanzania
2020 Elizabeth Giorgis, Modernist Art in Ethiopia
2021 Mai Hassan, Regime Threats and State Solutions: Bureaucratic Loyalty and Embeddedness in Kenya
2022 David L. Schoenbrun, The Names of the Python: Belonging in East Africa, 900 to 1930

Graduate Student Paper Prize 
In 2001, the ASA Board of Directors established an annual prize for the best graduate student paper. The prize is awarded at the Annual Meeting for an essay presented at the previous year's Annual Meeting. This prize highlights exceptional scholarship produced by emerging scholars in any African studies related discipline.

Winners of this award are:

 2002 – Benjamin Lawrance, “Le Revolte des Femmes: Economic Upheaval and the Gender of Political Authority in Lome, Togo, 1931-33”
 2003 – Staffan Lindberg, “The ‘Democraticness’ of Multiparty Elections: Participation, Competition, and Legitimacy in Africa”
 2004 – Kristin E. Cheney, “Village Life is Better than Town Life’: identity, migration and development in the Lives of Ugandan child citizens”
 2005 – Abena Dove Osseo-Asare, “’Dangerous Properties’: Poisoned Arrows and the Case of Strophanthus hispidus in Colonial Gold Coast, 1885 – 1922″
 2006 – Séverine Autesserre, “Local Violence, National Peace?  Local Dynamics of Violence during the Transition in the Eastern Democratic Republic of the Congo”
 2007 – Habtamu Mengistie Tegegne, “Revisiting Land Tenure in Eighteenth Century Gondärine Ethiopia: Zéga and the Land Charter of Däbrä-Sehay Qwesqwam Church”
 2008 – Kristin D. Phillips, “Consuming the State: Hunger, Healing, and Citizenship in Rural Tanzania”
 2009 – Bert Ingelaere, “Peasants, Power, and Ethnicity: Centre and Periphery in the Knowledge Construction in/on Post-Genocide Rwanda”
 2010 – Laura Weinstein, “The Politics of Government Expenditures in Tanzania: 1999-2007”
 2011 – Noel Twagiramungu, “The Anatomy of Leadership: A view-from-within Post-genocide Rwanda”
 2013 – Jamie Miller, “Yes, Minister: Reassessing South Africa's Intervention in the Angolan Civil War”
 2014 – Catherine Porter, “Bound and Unbound Identities: The Reconstruction of Katanga's Nationhood Struggle”
 2015 – Kathleen Klaus, “Contentious Land Claims and the Non-Escalation of Violence: Evidence from Kenya's Coast Region
 2016 – Moritz Nagel, “Precolonial Segmentation Revisited: Initiation Societies, Talking Drums and the Ngondo Festival in the Cameroons”
 2017 – Amanda B. Edgell, “Vying for the ‘Man's Seat’ – Constituency Magnitude and Mainstream Female Candidature for Non-Quota Seats in Uganda and Kenya”
 2018 – Shaonan Liu, “Symbol of Wealth and Prestige: A Social History of Chinese-made Enamelware in Northern Nigeria”
 2019 – Victoria Mary Gorham, “Displaying the Nation: Museums and Nation-Building in Tanzania and Kenya”
 2020 – Allen Xiao, “Lagos in Life: Placing Cities in Lived Experiences”
 2021 – Justin Haruyama, “Shortcut English: A Pidgin Language and Symbolic Power at a Chinese-operated Mine in Zambia.”

Presidents of ASA 
Presidents of the ASA are elected annually by the membership. They include:

Publications 
Publications include History in Africa: A Journal of Method, published annually and African Studies Review, published quarterly. The Association publishes a biannual newsletter ASA News for its members, and runs a news blog.

African Heritage Studies Association 

The African Heritage Studies Association was originally an offshoot of the African Studies Association, and was founded in 1968 by the ASA's Black Caucus and led by John Henrik Clarke.

Notes

External links 

African studies
Ethnic studies organizations
Cultural studies organizations
Organizations established in 1957
Rutgers University
Member organizations of the American Council of Learned Societies
Learned societies of the United States